This is a list of voids in astronomy. Voids are particularly galaxy-poor regions of space between filaments, making up the large-scale structure of the universe. Some voids are known as supervoids.

In the tables, z is the cosmological redshift, c the speed of light, and h the dimensionless Hubble parameter, which has a value of approximately 0.7 (the Hubble constant H0 = h × 100 km s−1 Mpc−1). Mpc stands for megaparsec.

The co-ordinates (right ascension and declination) and distance given refer to the approximate center of the region.

Voids and supervoids

Largest voids

Named voids

Voids designated by their constellation

Other voids

Voids by search or survey

Tully list
In 1985, Tully determined a local dominant supercluster plane, and found the Pisces–Cetus Supercluster Complex.

B&B Abell-derived list
In a 1985 study of Abell clusters, 29 voids were determined, in the sphere z<0.1 around Earth.

SSRS1 list
A redshift survey of galaxies in the southern sky in 1988, out to a distance of 120 Mpc/h, revealed some voids.

SSRS2 list
In 1994, a redshift survey in the southern sky identified 18 voids, 11 of which are major voids.

1994 EEDTA Whole Sky Survey
A 1994 census lists a total of 27 supervoids within a cube of 740 Mpc a side, centered on us (z=0.1 distant sphere).

Galactic Anti-Center IRAS search
In a 1995 study of IRAS data looking for large-scale structure in the Galactic Anticenter in the Zone of Avoidance, four voids were discovered.

IRAS list
Analysis of the IRAS redshift survey in 1997 revealed 24 voids, 12 of which were termed "significant"

See also
 Large scale structure of the universe
 Galaxy filament
 Supercluster
 Galaxy cluster
 Lists of astronomical objects

Notes

References

Voids